Provanna abyssalis is a species of abyssal sea snail, a marine gastropod mollusk in the family Provannidae.

Description

Distribution
This deep-water species occurs off Japan.

References

abyssalis
Gastropods described in 2002